The Nickelodeon UK Kids' Choice Awards 2008 aired on 20 September 2008 on Nickelodeon. It was the UK's second Kids' Choice Awards. The ceremony was presented by Australian singer and X Factor judge Dannii Minogue.

The Nickelodeon Kids' Choice Awards for the UK is very similar to the Australian and American versions. Children who voted on the  website had chances to get tickets to see the live ceremony in London.

Guests

 Ant & Dec
 Ross Lee
 Miranda Cosgrove
 Josh Peck
 John Cena
 Dakota Blue Richards
 William Moseley
 Anna Popplewell
 Georgie Henley
 Same Difference
 David Mayer
 Alesha Dixon
 Suzanne Shaw
 McFly
 George Sampson
 The Saturdays 
 Katie Sheridan
 Vicky Longley

Nominee winners

Favourite
 Drake & Josh – Kids' TV show
 SpongeBob SquarePants – Kids' cartoon
 Britain's Got Talent – Family TV show
 Josh Peck – Male TV star
 Miley Cyrus – Female TV Star
 Wall-E – Animated film
 William Moseley – Male film star The Chronicles of Narnia: Prince Caspian
 Georgie Henley – Female film star The Chronicles of Narnia: Prince Caspian
 Simon Cowell – TV baddie
 George Sampson – Winner
 Hadouken! – "Declaration of War" – MTV Hits Song
 Ant & Dec – Funny person(s), TV presenter(s)
 David Beckham – Sports Person
 Indiana Jones and the Kingdom of the Crystal Skull – Film
 Chris Brown – Singer

Other
 Sir David Attenborough – The Hero Award
 David Mayer – The Greenie Award

References

External links
 Nickelodeon
 Nickelodeon UK Kids Choice Awards

Nickelodeon Kids' Choice Awards
2008 awards
2008 in the United Kingdom